The European Journal of Medical Genetics is a monthly peer-reviewed medical journal covering medical genetics in human and experimental systems. It was established in 1958 as Annales de Génétique, obtaining its current name in 2005. It is published by Elsevier and the editor-in-chief is Alain Verloes (CHU Robert Debré). According to the Journal Citation Reports, the journal has a 2018 impact factor of 2.022.

References

External links

Biology in Europe
Medical genetics journals
Monthly journals
English-language journals
Elsevier academic journals
Publications established in 1958